Eucerin is a trademarked brand of Beiersdorf AG. In addition to body and face care products, Eucerin offers sun protectant and cleansing products.

History 
In 1900, Isaac Lifschütz manufactured a non-perishable and sleek ointment base consisting of Eucerit, water and oil, naming it Eucerin.
Two years later, in 1902, Lifschütz achieved the patent for his manufacture in Germany. 
In 1911, Oscar Troplowitz, who took over the  Beiersdorf company from its founder Paul C. Beiersdorf in 1890, bought the patent and a few years later the first Eucerin products (iodine creme, loose powder) were introduced on the German market.

In the 1980s the brand was launched by Beiersdorf affiliates globally, including the USA.
Since 1996 the brand also offers facial care products.

References

External links 
 Eucerin

Trademarks
Emollients and protectives
Beiersdorf brands
Products introduced in 1902